The Lethbridge Sugar Kings were a founding junior "A" ice hockey team in the Alberta Junior Hockey League (AJHL) based in Lethbridge, Alberta, Canada.

History 
The Lethbridge Sugar Kings were one of the five original member hockey teams of the AJHL, which began play in 1963-64. The team folded following the 1972–73 season with the forthcoming arrival of major junior hockey to Lethbridge. The team was saved by a different ownership group and renamed the Lethbridge Longhorns for the 1973–74 season, but lasted only two seasons due to competition with major junior hockey. The Lethbridge Broncos of the Western Hockey League arrived from Swift Current in 1974.

Season-by-season record 

Note: GP = games played, W = wins, L = losses, OTL = overtime losses, Pts = points, GF = goals for, GA = goals against, PIM = penalties in minutes

See also 
 List of ice hockey teams in Alberta

References

External links 
Alberta Junior Hockey League

Defunct Alberta Junior Hockey League teams
Defunct ice hockey teams in Alberta
Defunct junior ice hockey teams in Canada
Sport in Lethbridge
Ice hockey clubs established in 1963
1963 establishments in Alberta
1973 disestablishments in Alberta
Ice hockey clubs disestablished in 1973